The Boulder Creek Wilderness is a wilderness area located in the Umpqua National Forest in the southern Cascade Range of Oregon, United States.  It was designated by the United States Congress in 1984 and comprises .

Topography
It surrounds Boulder Creek, which flows south and west through the heart of the Wilderness and drains into the Wild and Scenic North Umpqua River.

Geology
 of the Boulder Creek Wilderness is designated the Umpqua Rocks Special Interest Geologic Area.  Large volcanic basalt and andesite monolithic spires with names such as Eagle Rock, Rattlesnake Rock, and Old Man are prominent landscape features.  These spires are popular among rock climbers.

The geologic formations in this area date to the early Tertiary Period, some 30 million years ago.  Volcanic intrusions, stocks, plugs and dikes were more common during this period of time.  Later periods involved pyroclastic tuffs and breccias associated more with volcanic flows of andesite and dacite material.

Vegetation

Old growth Ponderosa pines flourish on Pine Bench, near the lower end of Boulder Creek Wilderness.  This is thought to be the largest such stand this far northwest of the crest of the Cascade Mountains.  In 1996, the  Spring Fire burned through much of the Wilderness.  Scientists have since been in the area studying the long-term ecological effects of the fire.

See also

 List of old growth forests
 List of Oregon Wildernesses
 List of U.S. Wilderness Areas

References

External links

 Boulder Creek Wilderness - Umpqua National Forest

Cascade Range
Old-growth forests
Protected areas of Douglas County, Oregon
Umpqua National Forest
Wilderness areas of Oregon
1984 establishments in Oregon
Protected areas established in 1984